Brandy Pond, also known as Bay of Naples Lake, is a small lake in Naples, Maine, United States, that is connected to Long Lake by the Chute River. Brandy Pond is connected to Sebago Lake by the Songo River, which runs through Sebago Lake State Park. To get to Sebago Lake through the Songo River, one must pass through Songo Lock, one of the last remaining hand-operated locks in the country.

Brandy Pond is bounded by a commercial (downtown) area called the "causeway" on Rt. 302, an area of homes on the southerly side called Scenic Drive, a golf course on the northern side, as well as many private homes and public campgrounds and condominiums.

See also
Songo River Queen II

References

Lakes of Cumberland County, Maine
Naples, Maine
Lakes of Maine